San Pedro Church is a 14th-century church and 13th century bell tower in Teruel, located in the Province of Teruel in the Aragon region of northeastern Spain.

Architecture
The church and tower are examples of Aragonese Romanesque and Mudéjar architecture.

The brick bell tower is incrusted with glazed ceramic tiles.

The exterior of the church is also decorated with tiles, and has a polygonal apse reinforced with tower structures. The interior comprises a single nave with an ogive vaulted ceiling, and side chapels.

Landmarks
The church and tower are part of the UNESCO Mudéjar Architecture of Aragon World Heritage Site. They are also Bienes de Interés Cultural landmarks in the Province of Teruel.

Gallery

See also

Mudéjar architecture of Aragon
Catholic Church in Spain
List of Bienes de Interés Cultural in the Province of Zaragoza

References

External links
 Spain.info: Monuments in Teruel — San Pedro Church and Tower in Teruel—

Churches in Aragon
Buildings and structures in Teruel
Buildings and structures in the Province of Teruel
Mudéjar architecture in Aragon
Romanesque architecture in Aragon
14th-century Roman Catholic church buildings in Spain
Towers completed in the 13th century
Bien de Interés Cultural landmarks in the Province of Teruel
World Heritage Sites in Spain